The Lynch is an island in the River Thames in Berkshire, England. It is on the reach above Shiplake Lock near Lower Shiplake.

The island is large and triangular shaped, forming a pair with the similar Hallsmead Ait. It is uninhabited and tree covered and provides mooring on both sides in the back channel. Although the island is positioned towards the Oxfordshire bank of the river, it is actually in Berkshire.

See also
Islands in the River Thames

References

Islands of Berkshire
Islands of the River Thames